Alpengeist  is an inverted roller coaster located at Busch Gardens Williamsburg in Williamsburg, Virginia. Manufactured by Bolliger & Mabillard, Alpengeist has an Alpine mountain region theme and opened in 1997 as the tallest inverted coaster in the world. The name "Alpengeist" is German for "Ghost of the Alps" or "Alpine Spirit", and the ride is themed to a runaway ski lift. It has the records for the tallest complete circuit inverted coaster in the world, tallest inverted roller coaster in the United States, and the longest complete circuit coaster drop in the world.

History
On August 30, 1996, Busch Gardens Williamsburg announced the addition of Alpengeist for the 1997 season. It would break the record for height and speed among inverted roller coasters, and it would feature the tallest vertical loop on an inverted coaster. The ride would be the park's second new roller coaster in two years after Wild Maus. It would be built in the deepest ravine, with much of it hidden by trees. Park experts had worked on state-of-the-art devices to keep the noise lower, including switching from nylon wheels to quieter polyurethane wheels and pointing the major drop away from residential neighborhoods in Kingsmill.

Construction of Alpengeist began two months before the announcement in June 1996. The coaster would be made out of 106 track pieces, with seven for the lift hill, ten for the station and 89 for the rest of the layout.

Alpengeist officially opened on March 22, 1997. It held the record for tallest inverted coaster until the opening of Cedar Point's Wicked Twister in 2002. However, Alpengeist remained the world's tallest among complete-circuit inverted coasters. In 2021, it was surpassed again by Legendary Twin Dragon, an inverted shuttle coaster in China. Wicked Twister closed at the end of the 2021 season making Alpengeist the tallest inverted coaster in North America. Additionally, Alpengeist would hold the record for being the fastest inverted coaster until Volcano: The Blast Coaster at the nearby Kings Dominion surpassed it in 1998.

In 2022, Alpengeist was repainted with light blue supports.

Characteristics
The ride contains three trains, although only two are in use at any time. Three mechanics maintain the ride and spend four months each year completely reconstructing each of the trains. The trains each contain eight cars, each with a single row seating four riders, for a total of 32 riders per train. The trains feature a zero car at the front of the train which contains  of weight which allows the trains to complete larger elements. The trains also feature skis on the side of each seat support beam which adds to the theming of the ride. The trains' wheel protectors are also painted to resemble ski helmets, each having a unique design, and further adding to the theming.

Ride experience
The track turns right while dropping down a  spiral drop, going past The Land of The Dragons, with the train hitting . Following the drop, the train passes through a  Immelmann loop, followed by a  vertical loop. The track then races through a wooden tunnel before passing through a cobra roll over the Rhine River, adjacent to the Loch Ness Monster. Out of the cobra roll, the track crosses over the entrance to the cobra roll, passes by Griffon, then rises into the midcourse brake run. After the midcourse brakes, the track crosses over the exit from the Immelmann loop and then into another tunnel and down a drop before entering a zero-g roll, alongside the Le Scoot log flume. After a short section of straight track close to ground level, the track goes through a corkscrew followed by a clockwise upward helix, before making a left turn to the final brake run.

Awards

References

External links

 

Roller coasters introduced in 1997
Roller coasters in Virginia
Busch Gardens Williamsburg
Roller coasters operated by SeaWorld Parks & Entertainment
Inverted roller coasters manufactured by Bolliger & Mabillard